Mewata Stadium was a multi-purpose stadium in Calgary, Alberta, Canada. It was the home stadium of the Calgary Stampeders, both before and after the formation of the Canadian Football League in 1958, until they moved to McMahon Stadium for the 1960 season, where the team still plays.

The land for Mewata Park was a gift from the Government of Canada.  The Mewata Stadium opened in 1906, and by 1919 (if not earlier) had bleachers with a seating capacity of 10,000.

The stadium was razed in 1999 and replaced with Shaw Millennium Park, including a greenspace and skateboard park.

Other uses
Mewata Stadium was briefly the home of two Calgary soccer teams, the Calgary Mustangs of the Canadian Professional Soccer League in 1983 and the Calgary Kickers of the Canadian Soccer League from 1987 through 1989.

During World War II, 1st Battalion, The Calgary Highlanders, used the bleachers at Mewata Stadium to pose for unit photographs before departing for overseas service. The Highlanders had mobilized 1st Battalion for war service on 1 September 1939 and garrisoned at the adjacent Mewata Armouries until the summer of 1940. The Highlanders used the stadium for training purposes.

References

Canadian Football League venues
Defunct Canadian football venues
Defunct soccer venues in Canada
Defunct sports venues in Canada
Sports venues in Calgary
Soccer venues in Canada
Multi-purpose stadiums in Canada
Sports venues completed in 1906
1906 establishments in Alberta
1999 disestablishments in Alberta
Sports venues demolished in 1999
Demolished buildings and structures in Alberta
Demolished sports venues